Khmer numerals are the numerals used in the Khmer language. They have been in use since at least the early 7th century, with the earliest known use being on a stele dated to AD 604 found in Prasat Bayang, near Angkor Borei, Cambodia.

Numerals 

Having been derived from the Hindu numerals, modern Khmer numerals also represent a decimal positional notation system. It is the script with the first extant material evidence of zero as a numerical figure, dating its use back to the seventh century, two centuries before its certain use in India. Old Khmer, or Angkorian Khmer, also possessed separate symbols for the numbers 10, 20, and 100.

Each multiple of 20 or 100 would require an additional stroke over the character, so the number 47 was constructed using the 20 symbol with an additional upper stroke, followed by the symbol for number 7. This inconsistency with its decimal system suggests that spoken Angkorian Khmer used a vigesimal system.

As both Thai and Lao scripts are derived from Old Khmer, their modern forms still bear many resemblances to the latter, demonstrated in the following table:

Modern Khmer numbers 
The spoken names of modern Khmer numbers represent a biquinary system, with both base 5 and base 10 in use. For example, 6 is formed from 5 plus 1.

Numbers from 0 to 5 
With the exception of the number 0, which stems from Sanskrit, the etymology of the Khmer numbers from 1 to 5 is of proto-Austroasiatic origin.

 For details of the various alternative romanization systems, see Romanization of Khmer.
 In neighbouring Thailand the number three is thought to bring good luck. However, in Cambodia, taking a picture with three people in it is considered bad luck, as it is believed that the person situated in the middle will die an early death.

Comparison to other Austroasiatic languages 1-5 
Whilst Khmer and Vietnamese are very different languages, the numbers 1-5 both retain proto-Austroasiatic origins.

Numbers from 6 to 20 
The numbers from 6 to 9 may be constructed by adding any number between 1 and 4 to the base number 5, so that 7 is literally constructed as 5 plus 2. Beyond that, Khmer uses a decimal base, so that 14 is constructed as 10 plus 4, rather than 2 times 5 plus 4; and 16 is constructed as 10+5+1.

This is especially true in dialects which elide , but not necessarily restricted to them, as the pattern also follows Khmer's minor syllable pattern.

Numbers from 30 to 90 
The modern Khmer numbers from 30 to 90 are as follows:

 The word  , which appears in each of these numbers, can be dropped in informal or colloquial speech. For example, the number 81 can be expressed as   instead of the full  .

Historically speaking, Khmer borrowed the numbers from 30 to 90 from a southern Middle Chinese variety by way of a neighboring Tai language, most likely Thai. This is evidenced by the fact that the numbers in Khmer most closely resemble those of Thai, as well as the fact that the numbers cannot be deconstructed in Khmer. The table below shows how the words in Khmer compare to other nearby Tai and Sinitic languages.

 Words in parenthesis indicate literary pronunciations, while words preceded by an asterisk only occur in specific constructions and are not used for basic numbers from 3 to 10.

Prior to using a decimal system and adopting these words, Khmer used a base 20 system, so that numbers greater than 20 were formed by multiplying or adding on to the cardinal number for twenty. Under this system, 30 would've been constructed as (20 × 1) + 10 "twenty-one ten" and 80 was constructed as 4 × 20 "four twenties / four scores". See the section Angkorian numbers for details.

Numbers from 100 to 10,000,000 

The standard Khmer numbers starting from one hundred are as follows:

Although   is most commonly used to mean ten million, in some areas this is also colloquially used to refer to one billion (which is more properly  ).

Different Cambodian dialects may also employ different base number constructions to form greater numbers above one thousand. A few of the such can be observed in the following table:

Counting fruits 
Reminiscent of the standard base 20 Angkorian Khmer numbers, the modern Khmer language also possesses separate words used to count fruits, not unlike how English uses words such as a "dozen" for counting items such as eggs.

Sanskrit and Pali influence 
As a result of prolonged literary influence from both the Sanskrit and Pali languages, Khmer may occasionally use borrowed words for counting. Generally speaking, asides a few exceptions such as the numbers for 0 and 100 for which the Khmer language has no equivalent, they are more often restricted to literary, religious, and historical texts than they are used in day to day conversations. One reason for the decline of these numbers is that a Khmer nationalism movement, which emerged in the 1960s, attempted to remove all words of Sanskrit and Pali origin. The Khmer Rouge also attempted to cleanse the language by removing all words which were considered politically incorrect.

Ordinal numbers 
Khmer ordinal numbers are formed by placing the word   in front of a cardinal number. This is similar to the use of ที่ thi in Thai, and thứ (from Chinese 第) in Vietnamese.

Angkorian numbers 
It is generally assumed that the Angkorian and pre-Angkorian numbers also represented a dual base (quinquavigesimal) system, with both base 5 and base 20 in use. Unlike modern Khmer, the decimal system was highly limited, with both the numbers for ten and one hundred being borrowed from the Chinese and Sanskrit languages respectively. Angkorian Khmer also used Sanskrit numbers for recording dates, sometimes mixing them with Khmer originals, a practice which has persisted until the last century.

The numbers for twenty, forty, and four hundred may be followed by multiplying numbers, with additional digits added on at the end, so that 27 is constructed as twenty-one-seven, or 20×1+7.

Proto-Khmer numbers 
Proto-Khmer is the hypothetical ancestor of the modern Khmer language bearing various reflexes of the proposed proto-Mon–Khmer language. By comparing both modern Khmer and Angkorian Khmer numbers to those of other Eastern Mon–Khmer (or Khmero-Vietic) languages such as Pearic, Proto-Viet–Muong, Katuic, and Bahnaric; it is possible to establish the following reconstructions for Proto-Khmer.

Numbers from 5 to 10 
Contrary to later forms of the Khmer numbers, Proto-Khmer possessed a single decimal number system. The numbers from one to five correspond to both the modern Khmer language and the proposed Mon–Khmer language, while the numbers from six to nine do not possess any modern remnants, with the number ten *kraaj (or *kraay) corresponding to the modern number for one hundred. It is likely that the initial *k, found in the numbers from six to ten, is a prefix.

References 
General
 
 
 
 
 
 
 
 

Specific

Numerals
Numerals